is a Japanese multinational electronic components and printer manufacturing company headquartered in Shizuoka, Japan. It was founded in 1947 as a precision processor of miniature components, later expanding into automatic lathes, printers, micro audio components, and other fields.

Star Micronics employs around 2,500 staff in several countries and had total revenues of £267 million in 2010.

History 
Star Manufacturing Co., Ltd. was established in 1950 with a capital of ¥ 500,000, in Tegoshi, Shizuoka, to manufacture and sell wristwatches and camera parts.

In May 2022, Star Micronics introduced its TSP100IV, which offers features for omnichannel retail. The features also extend to its TSP143IV UE model, which provides multi-connectivity for mobile, cloud, and traditional POS applications.

References 

Electronics companies of Japan
Point of sale companies
Companies based in Shizuoka Prefecture
Electronics companies established in 1950
Japanese companies established in 1950
Japanese brands
Companies listed on the Tokyo Stock Exchange
Shizuoka (city)